Yassmin Hamdy Bayoumy Attia born: November 4, 1993, is an Egyptian karateka, who competes in the kumite 55 kg division. She won three medals at the world championships in 2012–2016, including a team gold in 2014 and an individual bronze in 2012. She also won an individual bronze medal at the 2013 World Games.

In 2021, she competed at the World Olympic Qualification Tournament held in Paris, France hoping to qualify for the 2020 Summer Olympics in Tokyo, Japan.

References

Living people
Egyptian female karateka
World Games bronze medalists
Year of birth missing (living people)
Competitors at the 2013 World Games
World Games medalists in karate
Islamic Solidarity Games medalists in karate
Islamic Solidarity Games competitors for Egypt
21st-century Egyptian women